Brorfelde Observatory (obs. code: 054) is an astronomical observatory located in Brorfelde near Holbæk, Denmark. It is home to the Brorfelde Schmidt Telescope and was run as a branch of the Copenhagen University Observatory until 1996. It still has telescopes that are used by University of Copenhagen students, but the operating staff moved to the Rockefeller Complex in Copenhagen.

Brorfelde Observatory and Brorfelde was a part of a Danish advent calendar running in 2012, and 2019 on DR1 - a Danish national TV channel.

Instruments  

The 77-centimetre Schmidt telescope from 1966 at Brorfelde Observatory was originally equipped with photographic film. An engineer is here showing the film-box, which was then placed behind the locker at the center of the telescope (at the telescope's prime focus).

Honors 

The Hungaria asteroid 3309 Brorfelde was discovered at, and named for the observatory. It was its first minor planet discovery. The naming citation was published by the Minor Planet Center on 7 September 1987.

People related to the observatory 
 Bengt Strömgren, Danish astronomer instrumental in founding it.
 Poul Jensen, Asteroid discoverer
 Karl Augustesen, Asteroid discoverer

Minor planets

See also 
 List of astronomical observatories

References

External links 

 http://brorfelde.dk/ Brorfelde Observatory Website
 https://www.ku.dk/english/ University of Copenhagen Website

Astronomical observatories in Denmark
Buildings and structures in Region Zealand